This article lists all power stations in Montenegro.

Coal

Hydroelectric

Wind power

See also
 List of power stations in Europe
 List of largest power stations in the world

References